The first series of Gladiators began airing on Seven Network on 29 April 1995 following successful versions of the Gladiators format in United States, United Kingdom and Finland. The series closely resembled the UK series albeit with just four events and the Eliminator.

Fifteen episodes were filmed in a progressive competition at the Brisbane Entertainment Centre between 24 March and 2 April. Kimberley Joseph and Aaron Pedersen presented the show whilst play by play commentary was by Tony Schibeci. John Alexander acted as referee and John Forsyth as assistant referee. Cheerleaders performed in the background of the events.

Winners of the heats received a Sony music system and a selection of CD's valued to $2,000. The runners up received a set of gym apparatus. The winners of the final won a car.

Gladiators

Male
 Condor - Alistair Gibb
 Cougar - Ashley Buck
 Force - John Gergelifi
 Hammer - Mark McGaw
 Taipan - Michael Melksham
 Tower - Ron Reeve
 Vulcan - John Seru

Force suffered an injury in Atlasphere in the third quarter final and had to retire from the show.

Female
 Blade - Bev Carter
 Cheeta - Nicky Davico
 Delta - Karen Alley
 Flame - Lynda Byrnes
 Fury - Julie Saunders
 Rebel - Barbara Kendell
 Storm - Charlene Machin

Events
Atlasphere, Duel, Gauntlet, Hang Tough, Hit & Run, Powerball, Pyramid, Suspension Bridge, Tilt and Wall were played over Series 1.

The Eliminator featured as the final event in every show.

Shows
Fifteen shows along with an unaired pilot were filmed with the televised shows taking the form of a progressive competition. Each show featured four events along with the Eliminator. The winner of the Eliminator would progress to the next round.

Winning challengers are in bold.

1 The challengers in this episode were actually members of the production crew and changed throughout the episode. The names given were just for filming purposes. The headstarts given in the Eliminator were not based on points scored in the events.
2Replaced Donna after she fell on her pugil stick and injured her leg.
3This would be the last ever appearance by Force after falling over in his Atlasphere and injuring his leg.
4Replaced Gina Goode who having won her heat was unable to continue in the Quarter finals due to an ankle injury sustained in Powerball in her heat.

Episode summary

Heat 1
Original airdate: 29 April 1995 
Challengers: Heather Marychurch v Gina Good, Clinton Barter v Howard Arbuthnot

Eliminator
Female: 5.5 second head start for Gina
Male: 5 second head start for Clinton
Winners: Gina Good & Howard Arbuthnot

Heat 2
Original airdate: 6 May 1995 
Challengers: Bernadette Withers v Tracey Nicholson, Andrew Halliday v Adam Cooney

Eliminator
Female: 1.5 second head start for Bernadette
Male: 7 second head start for Andrew
Winners: Bernadette Withers & Andrew Halliday

Heat 3
Original airdate: 13 May 1995 
Challengers: Sabrina Hooyman v Carol-Anne Horvath, David Wallis v Paul Vella

Eliminator
Female: 3 second head start for Sabrina
Male: 6.5 second head start for David
Winners: Sabrina Hooyman & David Wallis

Heat 4
Original airdate: 20 May 1995 
Challengers: Karen Swansborough v Hillary Ord, Corey Parker v Tony Langdon

Eliminator
Female: 12.5 second head start for Karen
Male: 5 second head start for Tony
Winners: Karen Swansborough & Tony Langdon

Heat 5
Original airdate: 27 May 1995 
Challengers: Nellie Baker v Fernanda Lacey, Ashley Martin v Alex Sanz

Eliminator
Female: 2.5 second head start for Fernanda
Male: 8.5 second head start for Ashley
Winners: Nellie Baker & Ashley Martin

Heat 6
Original airdate: 3 June 1995 
Challengers: Teresa Brett v Alison Jackson, Rod McQueen v John Powell

Eliminator
Female: 7.5 second head start for Alison
Male: 2 second head start for John
Winners: Teresa Brett & Rod McQueen

Heat 7
Original airdate: 10 June 1995 
Challengers: Annie Alderson v Kerry Warman, Mark Brine v Ian Jacobs

Eliminator
Female: 2.5 second head start for Kerry
Male: 2 second head start for Ian
Winners: Kerry Warman & Ian Jacobs

Heat 8
Original airdate: 17 June 1995 
Challengers: Tania Logan v Donna Sutor/Kathy Katzourakis, Rhett Foreman v Andrew Strickland

Eliminator
Female: 1.5 second head start for Tania
Male: 5 second head start for Andrew
Winners: Tania Logan & Rhett Foreman

1 Donna injured herself after landing on her pugil stick in Duel, therefore Kathy replaced her in Powerball.

Quarter-Final 1
Original airdate: 24 June 1995 
Challengers: Nellie Baker v Sabrina Hooyman, Ashley Martin v David Wallis

Eliminator
Female: 6.5 second head start for Nellie
Male: 2.5 second head start for Ashley
Winners: Nellie Baker & David Wallis

Quarter-Final 2
Original airdate: 1 July 1995 
Challengers: Kerry Warman v Bernadette Withers, Ian Jacobs v Andrew Halliday

Eliminator
Female: 3 second head start for Kerry
Male: 10 second head start for Andrew
Winners: Bernadette Withers & Andrew Halliday

Quarter-Final 3
Original airdate: 8 July 1995 
Challengers: Karen Swansborough v Teresa Brett, Tony Langdon v Rod McQueen

Eliminator
Female: 3 second head start for Karen
Male: 2 second head start for Rod
Winners: Teresa Brett & Rod McQueen

Quarter-Final 4
Original airdate: 15 July 1995 
Challengers: Tania Logan v Fernanda Lacey, Howard Arbuthnot v Rhett Foreman

Eliminator
Female: 3 second head start for Fernanda
Male: 1.5 second head start for Howard
Winners: Fernanda Lacey & Rhett Foreman

Semi-final 1
Original airdate: 22 July 1995 
Challengers: Teresa Brett v Nellie Baker, David Wallis v Rod McQueen

Eliminator
Female: Teresa walkover in to Grand Final due to Nellie's injury. 
Male: 1 second head start for David
Winners: Teresa Brett & David Wallis

Semi-final 2
Original airdate: 29 July 1995 
Challengers: Bernadette Withers v Fernanda Lacey, Andrew Halliday v Rhett Foreman

Eliminator
Female: 1 second head start for Fernanda
Male: 10 second head start for Andrew
Winners: Bernadette Withers & Andrew Halliday

Grand Final
Original airdate: 5 August 1995Challengers: Teresa Brett v Bernadette Withers, David Wallis v Andrew Halliday

Eliminator

Female: 2.5 second start for Bernadette
Male: 7.5 second start for Andrew
Winners: Bernadette Withers & Andrew Halliday

Cheerleaders

Choreographer: Davidia Lind

Cheerleaders: Cintra Bedford, Jane Crichton, Jessica Emblen, Sarah Harlow, Tamra Lind, Tamara Raup, Emma Sieber, Leigh-Anne Vizer, Francene Vedelago, Kyle Watson

Production
Production began in January 1995 when the producers began their search for Gladiators and challengers. The long list was cut to 100 people who attended tryouts in Brisbane (where it was decided the show would be filmed), Melbourne and Sydney. Fourteen Gladiators and a number of challengers were selected.

The apparatus was delivered to the Brisbane Entertainment Centre in March requiring 35 trucks and 100 riggers whilst the Gladiators filmed the opening credits at Dee Why. Challengers arrived at the BEC on 16 March to begin training.

An unaired pilot episode was filmed using the Gladiators and production crew as challengers. There was no audience and Force, Rebel and Cheeta did not compete in any events.

Filming commenced on 24 March and wrapped on 2 April. Initially audiences numbered 2,000 but grew to 5,000 as filming progressed. St John's Ambulance personnel were on site during filming.

The first episode aired on Seven Network on 29 April and immediately entered the top 10 most watch shows in Australia. A second series entered production in May.

References

1995 Australian television seasons
series one